The Housatonic Congregational Church is a historic church building at 1089 Main Street in Great Barrington, Massachusetts.  Built in 1892 it is a prominent local example of Queen Anne Revival architecture, and was listed on the National Register of Historic Places in 2002.  It is now home to the Unitarian Universalist Meeting of South Berkshire.

Architecture and building history
The former Housatonic Congregational Church is located in the village of Housatonic in northwestern Great Barrington, on the north side of Main Street between Depot and Front Streets.  It is a basically cruciform -story wood-frame structure, with a gabled roof and exterior clad in wooden shingles.  A tower stands in one of the inner corners of the cross, with a square base, and open octagonal belfry topped by an octagonal roof.  The front-facing gable has a large arched stained-glass window.  The main entrance is in the base of the tower, sheltered by a porch whose gable is decorated with a floral motif.

The church was built in 1892 to replace an earlier church, the first built for its original congregation in 1842.  It was designed by H. Neill Wilson, who also designed a number of notable Pittsfield buildings.  In 1902 a new parsonage replaced an earlier one which was purchased by the Monument Mills Company; it was sold in 1979 to provide funds for needed work on the church and the rest of the property.  The sanctuary's stained glass windows were restored in 1978.

The church was bought by the Unitarian Universalist Meeting of South Berkshire in 2014.

See also
Ramsdell Public Library, next door
National Register of Historic Places listings in Berkshire County, Massachusetts

References

External links
Unitarian Universalist Meeting of South Berkshire website

National Register of Historic Places in Berkshire County, Massachusetts
Queen Anne architecture in Massachusetts
Colonial Revival architecture in Massachusetts
Churches in Berkshire County, Massachusetts
Great Barrington, Massachusetts
Unitarian Universalist churches in Massachusetts